"I Might As Well Believe (I'll Live Forever)"" is a single by Canadian country music artist Carroll Baker. Released in 1977, it was the fourth single from her album Sweet Sensation. The song reached number one on the RPM Country Tracks chart in Canada in April 1978.

Chart performance

References

1977 singles
Carroll Baker songs
1977 songs
RCA Records singles